The sixth and final season of the American comedy television series Silicon Valley premiered in the United States on HBO on October 27, 2019, and concluded on December 8, 2019. It consisted of 7 episodes.

Cast

Main
 Thomas Middleditch as Richard Hendricks
 Josh Brener as Nelson "Big Head" Bighetti
 Martin Starr as Bertram Gilfoyle
 Kumail Nanjiani as Dinesh Chugtai
 Amanda Crew as Monica Hall
 Zach Woods as Donald "Jared" Dunn
 Matt Ross as Gavin Belson
 Suzanne Cryer as Laurie Bream
 Jimmy O. Yang as Jian-Yang
 Chris Diamantopoulos as Russ Hanneman

Recurring
 Chris Williams as Hoover
 Bernard White as Denpok
 Arturo Castro as Maximo Reyes
 Ben Feldman as Ron LaFlamme
 Helen Hong as Tracy
 Henry Phillips as John Stafford
 Nandini Bapat as Gwart

Episodes

Production
In April 2018, it was announced that HBO had renewed the series for a sixth season. In May 2019, HBO confirmed that season six would be the final season and that it would consist of seven episodes; the show had production delays to accommodate producer Alec Berg, who runs the HBO comedy series Barry.

Reception
On review aggregator Rotten Tomatoes, the season holds a 92% approval rating, with an average rating of 7 out of 10 based on 12 reviews. The site's critical consensus reads, "Though the strangeness of reality threatens to one-up it, Silicon Valleys final season is funny, fearless, and still playing by its own rules to the very end." On Metacritic, the season has a score of 78 out of 100 based on 4 reviews.

References

External links

2019 American television seasons
Silicon Valley (TV series)